Glastry College is an academic Secondary School situated in Ballyhalbert, County Down in Northern Ireland. Opened in 1957, the school has over 650 pupils age 11 to 18 and is divided into 3 house groups - McCormick, Montgomery, Nugent and Dunleath.

References

External links
Glastry College

1957 establishments in Northern Ireland
Educational institutions established in 1957
Secondary schools in County Down